The Livestock Emissions and Abatement Research Network is an international research network focused on improving the understanding of  greenhouse gas emissions from livestock agriculture. 

It was established in November 2007.

See also
Climate change in New Zealand
Environment of New Zealand

References

External links
Livestock Emissions and Abatement Research Network

Climate change in New Zealand
Agricultural organisations based in New Zealand
Livestock
International organisations based in New Zealand